The 1993 ITU Triathlon World Cup was a series of triathlon races organised by the International Triathlon Union (ITU) for elite-level triathletes. There were nine races held in seven countries, all of them held over a distance of 1500 m swim, 40 km cycle, 10 km run (an Olympic-distance triathlon).

Results

Amakusa, Japan 
 23 May 1993

Orange County, United States 
 6 June 1993

Los Cabos, Mexico 
 21 June 1993

Embrun, France 
 14 August 1993

Whistler, Canada 
 5 September 1993

Ilhéus, Brazil 
 20 September 1993

Maui, United States 
 25 September 1993

San Sebastián, Spain 
 3 October 1993

St. Thomas, U.S. Virgin Islands 
 24 October 1993

Final ranking

See also 
 1993 ITU Triathlon World Championships

References 
 Results

ITU Triathlon World Cup
World Cup